Moringa oleifera is a fast-growing, drought-resistant tree of the family Moringaceae, native to the Indian subcontinent. Common names include moringa, drumstick tree (from the long, slender, triangular seed-pods), horseradish tree (from the taste of the roots, which resembles horseradish), and ben oil tree or benzolive tree.

It is widely cultivated for its young seed pods and leaves, used as vegetables and for traditional herbal medicine. It is also used for water purification. Although listed as an invasive species in several countries, M. oleifera has "not been observed invading intact habitats or displacing native flora", so "should be regarded at present as a widely cultivated species with low invasive potential."

Description

The bark has a whitish-gray color and is surrounded by thick cork. Young shoots have purplish or greenish-white, hairy bark. The tree has an open crown of drooping, fragile branches, and the leaves build up a feathery foliage of tripinnate leaves.

The flowers are fragrant and hermaphroditic, surrounded by five unequal, thinly veined, yellowish-white petals.

Flowering begins within the first six months after planting. In seasonally cool regions, flowering only occurs once a year in late Spring and early Summer (northern hemisphere between April and June, southern hemisphere between October and December). In more constant seasonal temperatures and with constant rainfall, flowering can happen twice or even all year-round.

The fruit is a hanging, three-sided brown  capsule, which holds dark brown, globular seeds with a diameter around 1 cm. The seeds have three whitish papery wings and are dispersed by wind and water.

In cultivation, it is often cut back annually to 1–2 m (3–6 ft) and allowed to regrow so the pods and leaves remain within arm's reach.

Taxonomy 
French botanist François Alexandre Pierre de Garsault described the species as Balanus myrepsica, but his names are not accepted as valid, as he did not always give his descriptions binomial names.

French naturalist Jean-Baptiste Lamarck described the species in 1785. A combined analysis of morphology and DNA shows that M. oleifera is most closely related to M. concanensis, and the common ancestor of these two diverged from the lineage of M. peregrina.

Etymology 
The genus name Moringa derives from the Tamil word, murungai, meaning "twisted pod", alludes to the young fruit.  The species name oleifera is derived from the Latin words oleum "oil" and ferre "to bear".

The plant has numerous common names across regions where it is cultivated, with drumstick tree, horse radish tree or simply moringa used in English.

Ecology 
The moringa tree is not affected by any serious diseases in its native or introduced ranges.  In India, several insect pests are seen, including various caterpillars such as the bark-eating caterpillar, the hairy caterpillar, or the green leaf caterpillar. The budworms Noctuidae are known to cause serious defoliation. Damaging agents can also be aphids, stem borers, and fruit flies. In some regions, termites can also cause minor damage. If termites are numerous in soils, insects management costs are not bearable.

The moringa tree is a host to Leveillula taurica, a powdery mildew which causes damage in papaya crops in south India.

Cultivation 
The moringa tree is grown mainly in semiarid, tropical, and subtropical areas, corresponding in the United States to USDA hardiness zones 9 and 10. It tolerates a wide range of soil conditions, but prefers a neutral to slightly acidic (pH 6.3 to 7.0), well-drained, sandy or loamy soil. In waterlogged soil, the roots have a tendency to rot.  Moringa is a sun- and heat-loving plant, and does not tolerate freezing or frost. Moringa is particularly suitable for dry regions, as it can be grown using rainwater without expensive irrigation techniques.

Production area

Moringa is grown in home gardens and as living fences in South Asia and Southeast Asia, where it is commonly sold in local markets. In the Philippines and Indonesia, it is commonly grown for its leaves, which are used as food. Moringa is also actively cultivated by the World Vegetable Center in Taiwan, a center for vegetable research.

More generally, moringa grows in the wild or is cultivated in Central America and the Caribbean, northern countries of South America, Africa, South and Southeast Asia, and various countries of Oceania.

As of 2010, cultivation in Hawaii was in the early stages for commercial distribution in the United States.

Cultivation practice

Soil preparations
In tropical cultivation, soil erosion is a major problem, requiring soil treatment to be as shallow as possible. Plowing is required only for high planting densities. In low planting densities, digging pits and refilling them with soil is preferable to ensure good root system penetration without causing too much land erosion.

Propagation
Moringa can be propagated from seed or cuttings.
Direct seeding is possible because the germination rate of M. oleifera is high. Moringa seeds can be germinated year-round in well-draining soil. Cuttings of 1 m length and at least 4 cm diameter can be used for vegetative propagation.

Breeding 
In India, from where moringa most likely originated, the diversity of wild types gives a good basis for breeding programs. In countries where moringa has been introduced, the diversity is usually much smaller among the cultivar types. Locally well-adapted wild types, though, can be found in most regions.

Because moringa is cultivated and used in different ways,  breeding aims for an annual or a perennial plant are obviously different. The yield stability of fruits is an important breeding aim for the commercial cultivation in India, where moringa is cultivated as an annual. On less favorable locations, perennial cultivation has big advantages, such as less erosion. In Pakistan, varieties have been tested for the nutritional composition of their leaves on different locations. India selects for a higher number of pods and dwarf or semidwarf varieties. Breeders in Tanzania, though, are selecting for higher oil content.

Yield and harvest 
M. oleifera can be cultivated for its leaves, pods, and/or its kernels for oil extraction and water purification. The yields vary widely, depending on season, variety, fertilization, and irrigation regimen. Moringa yields best under warm, dry conditions with some supplemental fertilizer and irrigation. Harvest is done manually with knives, sickles, and stabs with hooks attached. Pollarding, coppicing, and lopping or pruning are recommended to promote branching, increase production, and facilitate harvesting.

Fruits 
When the plant is grown from cuttings, the first harvest can take place 6–8 months after planting. Often, the fruits are not produced in the first year, and the yield is generally low during the first few years. By year two, it produces around 300 pods, by year three around 400–500. A good tree can yield 1,000 or more pods. In India, a hectare can produce 31 tons of pods per year. Under North Indian conditions, the fruits ripen during the summer. Sometimes, particularly in South India, flowers and fruit appear twice a year, so two harvests occur, in July to September and March to April.

Leaves 
Average yields of 6 tons/ha/year in fresh matter can be achieved. The harvest differs strongly between the rainy and dry seasons, with 1120 kilogram/ha per harvest and 690 kg/ha per harvest, respectively. The leaves and stems can be harvested from the young plants 60 days after seeding and then another seven times in the year. At every harvest, the plants are cut back to within 60 cm of the ground.  In some production systems, the leaves are harvested every 2 weeks.

The cultivation of M. oleifera can also be done intensively with irrigation and fertilization with suitable varieties. Trials in Nicaragua with 1 million plants per hectare and 9 cuttings/year over 4 years gave an average fresh matter production of 580 metric tons/ha/year, equivalent to about 174 metric tons of fresh leaves.

Oil 
One estimate for yield of oil from kernels is 250 L/ha. The oil can be used as a food supplement, as a base for cosmetics, and for hair and the skin. Seeds of Moringa can also be used in production of biofuel.

Toxicity 
Toxicity data in humans is limited, although lab studies indicate that certain compounds in the bark and roots or their extracts may cause adverse effects when consumed in excess. Supplementation with M. oleifera leaf extract is potentially toxic at levels exceeding 3,000 milligram/kg of body weight but safe at levels below 1,000 mg/kg. M. oleifera may interfere with prescription drugs affecting cytochrome P450 (including CYP3A4) and may inhibit the anti-hyperglycemic effect of sitagliptin.

Uses 
M. oleifera has numerous applications in cooking throughout its regional distribution. Edible parts of the plant include the whole leaves (leaflets, stalks and stems); the immature, green fruits or seed pods; the fragrant flowers; and the young seeds and roots.

Nutrition 

Various parts of moringa are edible:
 Immature seed pods, called "drumsticks"
 Leaves
 Mature seeds
 Oil pressed from seeds
 Flowers
 Roots

Nutritional content of 100 g of fresh M. oleifera leaves (about 5 cups)  is shown in the table (USDA data).

The leaves are the most nutritious part of the plant, being a significant source of B vitamins, vitamin C, provitamin A as beta-carotene, vitamin K, manganese, and protein. When compared with common foods particularly high in certain nutrients per 100 g fresh weight, cooked moringa leaves are considerable sources of these same nutrients. Some of the calcium in moringa leaves is bound as crystals of calcium oxalate. Oxalate levels may vary from 430 mg/100g to 1050 mg/100g, compared to the oxalate in spinach (average 750 mg/100g).

Seeds 
The seeds can be removed from mature pods, cut, and cooked for consumption.

In Nigeria, the seeds are prized for their bitter flavor; they are commonly added to sauces or eaten as a fried snack. The edible seed oil may be used in condiments or dressings.

Ground, debittered moringa seed is suitable as a fortification ingredient to increase the protein, iron and calcium content of wheat flours.

Fruit pods 

The young, slender fruits, commonly known as "drumsticks", are often prepared as a culinary vegetable in South Asia. They are prepared by parboiling, commonly cut into shorter lengths, and cooked in a curry or soup until soft. The taste is described as reminiscent of asparagus, with a hint of green beans, though sweeter due to the immature seeds contained inside. The seed pods, even when cooked by boiling, remain high in vitamin C (which may be degraded variably by cooking), and are also a good source of dietary fiber, potassium, magnesium, and manganese.

In India and Bangladesh, drumstick curries are commonly prepared by boiling immature pods to the desired level of tenderness in a mixture of coconut milk and spices (such as poppy or mustard seeds). The fruit is a common ingredient in dals and lentil soups, such as drumstick dal and sambar, where it is pulped first, then simmered with other vegetables and spices like turmeric and cumin. Mashed drumstick pulp commonly features in bhurta, a mixture of lightly fried or curried vegetables.

Because the outer skin is tough and fibrous, drumsticks are often chewed to extract the juices and nutrients, with the remaining fibrous material discarded. Others describe a slightly different method of sucking out the flesh and tender seeds and discarding the tube of skin.

Seed oil 
Mature seeds yield 38–40% edible oil called ben oil from its high concentration of behenic acid. The refined oil is clear and odorless, and resists rancidity. The young fruits can be boiled and the oil skimmed off the water surface. The seed cake remaining after oil extraction may be used as a fertilizer or as a flocculent to purify water. Moringa seed oil also has potential for use as a biofuel.

Roots 
The roots are shredded and used as a condiment with sharp flavor qualities deriving from significant content of polyphenols.

Leaves 
Edible raw or cooked (depending on hardiness), the leaves can be used in many ways. They are perhaps most commonly added to clear broth-based soups, such as the Filipino dishes tinola and utan. Tender moringa leaves, finely chopped, are used as garnish for vegetable dishes and salads, such as the Kerala dish thoran. It is also used in place of or along with coriander. The leaves are also cooked and used in ways similar to spinach, and are commonly dried and crushed into a powder for soups and sauces.

For long-term use and storage, moringa leaves may be dried and powdered to preserve their nutrients. Sun, shade, freeze and oven drying at 50–60 °C are all acceptable methods, albeit variable in their retention efficacy of specific micro- and macronutrients. The powder is commonly added to soups, sauces and smoothies. Owing to its high nutritional density, moringa leaf powder is valued as a dietary supplement and may be used to enrich food products ranging from dairy, such as yogurt and cheese, to baked goods, such as bread and pastries, with acceptable sensory evaluation.

Traditional medicine and research 
The bark, sap, roots, leaves, seeds and flowers are used in traditional medicine.

Research has examined how it might affect blood lipid profiles and insulin secretion. Extracts from leaves contain various polyphenols, which are under basic research to determine their potential effects in humans. Despite considerable preliminary research to determine if moringa components have bioactive properties, there is no high-quality evidence to indicate that it has any effect on health or diseases.

Other uses 
In developing countries, moringa has the potential to improve nutrition, boost food security, foster rural development, and support sustainable landcare. It may be used as forage for livestock, a micronutrient liquid, a natural anthelmintic, and possible adjuvant.

Moringa trees have been used to combat malnutrition, especially among infants and nursing mothers. Since moringa thrives in arid and semiarid environments, it may provide a versatile, nutritious food source throughout the year in various geographic regions. Some 140 organizations worldwide have initiated moringa cultivation programs to lessen malnutrition, purify water, and produce oils for cooking.

Moringa oleifera leaf powder was as effective as soap for hand washing when wetted in advance to enable anti-septic and detergent properties from phytochemicals in the leaves. Moringa oleifera seeds and press cake have been implemented as wastewater conditioners for dewatering and drying fecal sludge.

Moringa seed cake, obtained as a byproduct of pressing seeds to obtain oil, is used to filter water using flocculation to produce potable water for animal or human consumption. Moringa seeds contain dimeric cationic proteins which absorb and neutralize colloidal charges in turbid water, causing the colloidal particles to clump together, making the suspended particles easier to remove as sludge by either settling or filtration.  Moringa seed cake removes most impurities from water. This use is of particular interest for being nontoxic and sustainable compared to other materials in moringa-growing regions where drinking water is affected by pollutants.

Gallery

References

External links

 

Asian vegetables
oleifera
Flora of the Indian subcontinent
Biofuels
Medicinal plants of Asia
Phytoremediation plants
Water treatment
Tropical agriculture
Burmese cuisine
Bengali cuisine
Plants described in 1785
Taxa named by Jean-Baptiste Lamarck